David Knox Barton (born September 21, 1927 in Greenwich, Connecticut, died February 11, 2023 in Hanover, New Hampshire) was an American radar systems engineer who made significant contributions to air defense, missile guidance, monopulse radar, low-altitude tracking, air traffic control, and early warning radar. At age 30, he was the first winner of the David Sarnoff Award in Engineering, for his contributions to precise tracking radars.  Holder of the IEEE's Centennial Medal, Millennium Medal, and Dennis J. Picard Medal,  he is widely regarded throughout the world as a leading authority on radar technology.  He authored a well-regarded series of reference books on radar engineering in the late 1970s. David Barton was one of the people behind the MIM-104 Patriot surface-to-air missile system.

In 1997, Barton was elected a member of the National Academy of Engineering for contributions to radar system design and analysis.

References

Further reading

Books
 the 7-volume Radars book series from Artech House, 1974–1978
 David K. Barton, Modern Radar System Analysis, Artech House, 1988, 
 David Knox Barton, A. I. Leonov, Sergey A. Leonov, I. A. Morozov, Paul C. Hamilton, Radar Technology Encyclopedia, Artech House, 1997, 
 David K. Barton, Radar Technology Encyclopedia, Artech House, 1997 
 David K. Barton, Radar System Analysis and Modeling, Artech House, 2005, 
 David K. Barton, Radar Equations for Modern Radar, Artech House, 2013

External links
 David K. Barton's biography at ieee.org

1927 births
People from Greenwich, Connecticut
Fellow Members of the IEEE
Living people
Members of the United States National Academy of Engineering
Harvard University alumni
Engineers from Connecticut
American electrical engineers